Macindoe is a surname. Notable people with the surname include:

David Macindoe (1917–1986), English cricketer
Flowerdew Macindoe (1865–1932), Scottish rugby union player
Molly Macindoe (born 1979), American photographer
Tim Macindoe (born 1961), New Zealand politician

See also
McIndoe